Otto of Grandson may refer to:
Otto I of Grandson (died 1328), a knight in the service of the English crown.
Otto of Grandson (died 1309), Prince-Bishop of Basel.